Echo Boomers is a 2020 American crime drama film directed by Seth Savoy and starring Patrick Schwarzenegger, Alex Pettyfer and Michael Shannon.  It's Savoy's feature directorial debut.

Plot 
In the midst of financial crisis, a recent college graduate Lance Zutterland, who leaves school in debt, decides to join with other college graduates – consisting of Ellis, Jack, Stewart, Chandler, and Allie – stealing valuable paintings owned by Chicago's richest for themselves under the supervision of Mel Donnelly. During the heist, the group expresses their anger by wrecking anything valuable but Mel will only pay them if they deliver the stolen paintings intact. Lance bonds with Ellis’s girlfriend Allie and they become friends but upon bringing Allie home to their apartment, Ellis intimidates Lance into staying away from her.

They buy expensive business attire and pretend to be accountants so they can interview with upper class clients and trick them into giving them their address. In one of their heists, Chandler inadvertently crosses paths with a realtor and his facial composite is released to the public. While Ellis leaves the table for a minute, Jack plugs Ellis’s phone into his laptop to copy the images, where they see the house of Daniel Wardlaw. The group realize that Wardlaw’s house has a vault and they agree to rob his house. Mel summons the group where he introduces his new henchmen, threatening to go after them if someone reveals Mel’s name. Later, they go to a nightclub where Allie loses consciousness after an overdose of cocaine. They bring Allie to the hospital, but knowing that bringing her in may lead to their arrest, Stewart kicks her out. Lance reluctantly helps her despite the group’s objections and stays by her side for the night. On their way to Wardlaw’s, Lance argues with Stewart over his recklessness. Arriving there, Jack ties Wardlaw up and Stewart and Chandler take most of the money from the vault. Angry over Stewart’s negligence to Allie, Lance locks them up in the vault and drives away with Jack and the bags of money. They arrive at Ellis’s apartment to get Allie, who refuses to go with Jack after being persuaded by Ellis. The rest of the group including Mel is subsequently arrested and each of them are sentenced to at least seven years.

Lance and Jack hide at the motel in Nebraska where they stay the night. The next morning, Lance wakes up to find Jack and the van gone, with nowhere else to go and penniless, he turned himself to the police.

Cast
Patrick Schwarzenegger as Lance Zutterland
Michael Shannon as Mel Donnelly
Alex Pettyfer as Ellis Beck
Lesley Ann Warren as Author
Hayley Law as Allie Tucker
Gilles Geary as Jack
Oliver Cooper as Stewart
Jacob Alexander as Chandler Gaines
Kate Linder as Kathy Tucker

Production
Early in development, Nick Robinson and Britt Robertson were previously attached to star in the film.

Release
In September 2020, it was announced that Saban Films acquired the film's North American distribution rights.

The film was be released in theaters, VOD and digital platforms on November 13, 2020.

Reception
The film opened to mixed reviews, mainly critics vs audiences. The film has  rating by the critics on Rotten Tomatoes.  The Chicago Tribune awarded the film 3/4 stars. Jeffrey M. Anderson of Common Sense Media awarded the film two stars out of five.

References

External links

American crime drama films
2020 films
2020 crime drama films
Films about financial crises
2020s heist films
American heist films
2020s English-language films
2020s American films